Franjo Glaser (surname sometimes written Glazer; 7 January 1913 – 1 March 2003) was a Croatian football goalkeeper and football manager. He is the only Yugoslav footballer who won national titles before and after the Second World War, with three clubs BSK Belgrade, Građanski Zagreb and FK Partizan.

Club career
Glaser was born in Sarajevo. He started playing for SK Hajduk Sarajevo having debuted for their first team being only 15. He was Hajduk goalkeeper in their games in the 1930 Yugoslav Cup. In 1930 he moved to NK Slavija Osijek where he will play until 1933 when he moved to BSK Belgrade.  With BSK he made an immediate impact becoming the club's main goalkeeper, and already that year he became a national team player, as well.  He played with BSK between 1933 and 1937 winning the Yugoslav championship on two occasions, in 1935 and 1936, and playing a total of 269 matches with the club.

In summer 1936 he was considered guilty by the court in Belgrade of the drowning of one boy in the Sava river resort. The episode affected Glaser and ended up being decisive in his to move to another giant of Yugoslav football, Zagreb's HŠK Građanski. He acquired an almost a legendary status there. He restored his place as the national team main goalkeeper, and with Građanski he will win another Yugoslav championship in 1940 as well as the Croatian championship in 1943. He played a total of 623 games for Građanski.

After the end of the Second World War, Federal People's Republic of Yugoslavia was formed, he signed with Partizan Belgrade where he won another Yugoslav title in 1947. After that season, he became simultaneously coach and goalkeeper of NK Mornar Split, where he will stay until 1949.

Between 1933 and 1949 he played a total of 1,225 matches. Tall, strong, elastic, with excellent reflexes and brave interventions, he is definitely considered one of the best Yugoslav players from that period. He has also the impressive record of having defended 73 of 94 penalties he stood against.

International career
While playing for BSK and Građanski Glaser was the regular goalkeeper of the Yugoslav national team having earned a total of 35 caps. His debut was on 3 April 1933 in a friendly match against Spain, 1–1 draw, and his fairway was in a friendly played on 3 November 1940 against Germany, 2–0 win.

After the invasion of Yugoslavia, Glaser played further eleven matches for the Croatian national team, all four matches that Banovina Croatia played, and seven matches for the Independent State of Croatia. His final international was an April 1944 friendly match against Slovakia.

Coaching career and retirement
When coming to the newly formed FK Partizan in 1945 Glaser beside their goalkeeper became their first manager. However that year the league has not been yet reestablished and by the end of the year he was replaced by the Hungarian Illés Spitz. He stayed in Belgrade until 1947, but when he moved to Mornar Split he would experience again the feeling of being a manager/player. This early coaching experiences proved to be an excellent way of gaining experience, and Glaser later managed numerous clubs, such as GNK Dinamo Zagreb, NK Kvarner Rijeka, NK Proleter Osijek, FK Borac Banja Luka, NK Trešnjevka Zagreb, Austria FC Klagenfurt (today's FC Kärnten) and FK Sartid Smederevo, among others.

He spent his final years at a retirement home in Zagreb. He is buried in Mirogoj Cemetery.

Honours

Player
BSK Belgrade
Kingdom of Yugoslavia First League: 1934-35, 1935-36
Yugoslav Cup: 1934

Građanski Zagreb
Kingdom of Yugoslavia First League: 1939-40
Banovina of Croatia First League: 1940
ISC First League: 1941, 1943

Partizan
Yugoslav First League: 1946–47
Yugoslav Cup: 1947

References

External links
 
 Franjo Glaser at Nogometni leksikon
 
 NAJBOLJI DINAMOV VRATAR SVIH VREMENA Golman koji je sa 3:0 sam pobijedio Juventus! Zgodan poput glumca, a među vratinicama suveren i hladan! 

1913 births
2003 deaths
Footballers from Osijek
Croatian people of Austrian descent
Association football goalkeepers
Yugoslav footballers
Yugoslavia international footballers
Croatian footballers
Croatia international footballers
Dual internationalists (football)
OFK Beograd players
HŠK Građanski Zagreb players
FK Partizan players
Yugoslav First League players
Yugoslav football managers
FK Partizan managers
RNK Split managers
HNK Rijeka managers
NK Osijek managers
NK Zagreb managers
FK Borac Banja Luka managers
FK Sloga Doboj managers
SK Austria Klagenfurt managers
FK Velež Mostar managers
FK Smederevo managers
Yugoslav expatriate football managers
Expatriate football managers in Austria
Yugoslav expatriate sportspeople in Austria
Burials at Mirogoj Cemetery